Alvin C. Hollingsworth (25 February 1928 – July 14, 2000), whose pseudonyms included Alvin Holly, was an American painter and one of the first black artists in comic books.

Biography

Early life and comics
Alvin Carl Hollingsworth was born in Harlem, New York City, New York, of West Indian parents, and began drawing at age 4. By 12 he was an art assistant on Holyoke Publishing's Cat-Man Comics. Attending The High School of Music & Art, he was a classmate of future comic book artist and editor Joe Kubert.

Circa 1941, he began illustrating for crime comics. Since it was not standard practice during this era for comic-book credits to be given routinely, comprehensive credits are difficult to ascertain; Hollingsworth's first confirmed comic-book work is the signed, four-page war comics story "Robot Plane" in Aviation Press' Contact Comics #5 (cover-dated March 1945), which he both penciled and inked. Through the remainder of the 1940s, he confirmably drew for Holyoke's Captain Aero Comics (as Al Hollingsworth), and Fiction House's Wings Comics, where he did the feature "Suicide Smith" at least sporadically from 1946 to 1950. He is tentatively identified under the initials "A. H." as an artist on the feature "Captain Power" in Novack Publishing's Great Comics in 1945.

In the following decade, credited as Alvin Hollingsworth or A. C. Hollingsworth, he drew for a number of publishers and series, including Avon Comics' The Mask of Dr. Fu Manchu; Premier Magazines' Police Against Crime; Ribage's  romance comic Youthful Romances; and such horror comics as Master Comics' Dark Mysteries and Trojan Magazine's Beware. As Al Hollingsworth, he drew at least one story each for Atlas Comics, Premier Magazines, and Lev Gleason Publications. One standard source credits him, without specification, as an artist on stories for Fox Comics (the feature "Numa" in Rulah, Jungle Goddess, and "Bronze Man' in Blue Beetle) and on war stories for the publisher Spotlight.

Historian Shaun Clancy, citing Fawcett Comics writer-editor Roy Ald as his source, identified Hollingsworth as an artist on Fawcett's Negro Romance #2 (Aug. 1950).

Hollingsworth graduated from City College of New York, Phi Beta Kappa, as a fine arts major, and later completed some graduate work. In the mid-1950s, he worked on newspaper comic strips including Kandy (1954-1955) from the Smith-Mann Syndicate, as well as Scorchy Smith (1953-1954) and, with George Shedd, Marlin Keel (1953-1954).

During the 1960s, Hollingsworth taught illustration at the High School of Art & Design in Manhattan.

Fine art career
Hollingsworth thereafter left comics for a career as a fine art painter, and from 1980 until retiring in 1998 he taught art as a professor at Hostos Community College of the City University of New York. As a painter, his subjects included such contemporary social issues as civil rights for women and African Americans, as well as jazz and dance. Of one subject he painted, an African Jesus Christ, he told Ebony magazine in 1971, "I have always felt that Christ was a Black man," and said the subject represented a "philosophical symbol of any of the modern prophets who have been trying to show us the right way. To me, Malcolm X and Martin Luther King are such prophets." An authority on fluorescent paint, he worked in both representational and abstract art.

In the summer of 1963, Hollingsworth and fellow African-American artists Romare Bearden and William Majors formed the group Spiral in order to help the Civil Rights Movement through art exhibitions. At some point during the 1960s, he directed an art program teaching young students commercial art and fine art at the Harlem Parents Committee Freedom School. Examples of Hollingsworth's work are held in the permanent collections of the Smithsonian National Museum of African American History and Culture, the Brooklyn Museum, and the Harvey B. Gantt Center for African-American Arts+Culture, in Charlotte, North Carolina. His work is also held in numerous academic, corporate and private collections.

Personal life
Hollingsworth was married to wife Marjorie, and had children Kim, Raymond, Stephen, Kevin, Monique, Denise and Jeanette. He was living in New York's Westchester County at the time of his death at age 72.

Bibliography
Hollingsworth, A. C. I'd Like the Goo-Gen-Heim: writer-illustrator, children's book (1970; reprinted Guggenheim Foundation, 2009)
Hollingsworth, Alvin C. (illustrator), with Arnold Adoff (compiler), Black Out Loud: an anthology of modern poems by Black Americans (Atheneum, 1970), Atheneum,

References

External links

1928 births
2000 deaths
American comics artists
African-American artists
African-American comics creators
American comics creators
Golden Age comics creators
The High School of Music & Art alumni
Hostos Community College faculty